Wesley Moodie was the defending champion, but lost in the third round to Roger Federer.

First-seeded Roger Federer won in the final 6–3, 6–3, against Tim Henman.

Seeds
All seeds receive a bye into the second round.

Draw

Finals

Top half

Section 1

Section 2

Bottom half

Section 3

Section 4

External links
Draw
Qualifying Draw

2006 Japan Open Tennis Championships